Morvern Callar is a 2002 British psychological drama film directed by Lynne Ramsay and starring Samantha Morton as the titular character. The screenplay, co-written by Ramsay and Liana Dognini, was based on the 1995 novel of the same name by Alan Warner. The film received positive reviews from critics.

Synopsis
Morvern Callar is a young woman in a small port town in Scotland who works at a supermarket. She wakes on Christmas morning to discover that her boyfriend has killed himself, leaving a suicide note, a mix tape, Christmas presents, and the manuscript of his unpublished novel behind. His novel is dedicated to her, and Morvern decides to erase his name from the manuscript and replace it with her own before sending it to the publisher recommended in his suicide note. Despite him having left her money to arrange a funeral, Morvern tells her best friend and co-worker Lanna that her boyfriend has left her and moved abroad.

After several days, Morvern cuts up his body and buries it in the mountains, and arranges a holiday to Almería, Spain with Lanna, who shortly before departure reveals to Morvern that she had slept with her boyfriend previously. As they go out and party, Morvern feels she's in a different mood from Lanna and heads back to the hotel; she meets a man whose mother has recently died, and has sex with him. The next day, Morvern convinces Lanna to travel with her to another town, where they get lost and spend the night on a rural road. Lanna becomes exasperated with Morvern, and in the morning Morvern leaves her. Morvern meets with publishers who have travelled to Spain with hopes of getting the rights to the manuscript. Morvern continues to pretend she wrote the novel and accepts a £100,000 advance.

Back in Scotland, Morvern attempts to convince Lanna to leave with her, but Lanna refuses, stating her life is in Scotland and warning Morvern that everywhere else is just as bad. Morvern collects her suitcase and goes to the railway station, and is last seen in a nightclub, listening to "Dedicated to the One I Love" from the mixtape her boyfriend left for her.

Cast
 Samantha Morton as Morvern Callar
 Kathleen McDermott as Lanna

Critical reception
Morvern Callar received positive reviews from critics. It holds a rating of 78/100 on Metacritic, and an 84% approval rating on Rotten Tomatoes, based on 82 reviews, with an average score of 7.1/10. The critical consensus stating "Morton quietly makes this quirky, enigmatic mood piece a compelling watch." At the 2002 Cannes Film Festival, the film premiered during the Directors' Fortnight, where it was awarded the Award of the Youth for Best Foreign Film. At the 2002 British Independent Film Awards, Morvern Callar received seven nominations, including Best Director for Ramsay, Best Screenplay for Ramsay and Dognini, and Most Promising Newcomer for Kathleen McDermott; Samantha Morton won the award for Best Actress. Additionally, McDermott was awarded the Best Actress Award at the 2002 BAFTA Scotland Awards.

Soundtrack
Can – "I Want More"
Aphex Twin – "Goon Gumpas"
Boards Of Canada – "Everything You Do Is A Balloon"
Can – "Spoon"
Stereolab – "Blue Milk" (Edit)
The Velvet Underground – "I'm Sticking With You"
Broadcast – "You Can Fall"
Gamelan – "Drumming"
Holger Czukay – "Cool In The Pool"
Lee "Scratch" Perry – "Hold Of Death"
Nancy Sinatra and Lee Hazlewood – "Some Velvet Morning"
Ween – "Japanese Cowboy"
Holger Czukay – "Fragrance"
Aphex Twin – "Nannou"
Taraf de Haïdouks – "Cînd eram la '48"

References

External links 
 
 
 
 

2002 films
2002 drama films
British drama films
English-language Scottish films
Films about suicide
Films directed by Lynne Ramsay
Films set in Spain
Scottish films
Films based on British novels
Films set in Scotland
Films shot in Almería
2000s English-language films
2000s British films